Zak Hill (born September 14, 1979) is an American football coach who was the offensive coordinator and quarterbacks coach at Arizona State University. He was also previously the offensive coordinator at Boise State University.

Early life and playing career 
A native of Battle Ground, Washington, Hill played quarterback at Central Washington University from 1999 to 2003, where he threw for over 8,000 yards and 76 touchdowns in his career. He was a third-team All-American in 2002, where he led Central Washington to an 11–1 record. He graduated from Central Washington in 2004 with a degree in school health education.

Coaching career

Early coaching career 
Hill began his coaching career at Eastern Washington in 2004, where he worked as a student assistant for two years. He left Eastern Washington to be the offensive coordinator at Hillsboro High School in Oregon. He was promoted to head coach in 2008, leading the Spartans to a 6–5 record and a playoff berth in the state's Class 5A playoffs. He left Hillsboro to rejoin Eastern Washington as the team's passing game coordinator and quarterbacks coach. He served in that role for 6 years before leaving for Hawaii.

Hawaii 
Hill was hired to be the next offensive coordinator and quarterbacks coach for the University of Hawaii in 2016. However, Hill resigned after 48 days to accept a position with Boise State as their new co-offensive coordinator and quarterbacks coach. He left at a crucial point in recruiting, leaving Hawaii just seven days before high school athletes could sign their letters of intent.

Boise State 
Hill was hired by Boise State in 2016, sharing offensive coordinator duties with Scott Huff and coaching quarterbacks. After Huff left to be the run game coordinator and offensive line coach at Washington, Hill was promoted to the sole offensive coordinator.

Arizona State 
Hill was named the offensive coordinator and quarterbacks coach for Arizona State in December 2019, replacing Rob Likens. Hill resigned January 28, 2022 as OC amid the NCAA investigation into the football program’s recruiting practices during the Covid dead period.

Saguaro HS (AZ) 
Hill was hired to replace Jason Mohns, who took a coaching role at Arizona State.

References 

1979 births
Living people
Sportspeople from Portland, Oregon
People from Battle Ground, Washington
Players of American football from Portland, Oregon
Players of American football from Washington (state)
Coaches of American football from Oregon
Coaches of American football from Washington (state)
American football quarterbacks
Central Washington Wildcats football players
Eastern Washington Eagles football coaches
High school football coaches in Oregon
Hawaii Rainbow Warriors football coaches
Boise State Broncos football coaches
Arizona State Sun Devils football coaches